Ednam House is a historic home located near Ednam, Albemarle County, Virginia. It was designed by Richmond architect D. Wiley Anderson in Colonial Revival style.  It was built about 1905, and is a two-story, wood-frame structure sheathed in weatherboards and set on a low, brick foundation. The main block is covered by a steep deck-on-hip roof, with tall, brick, pilastered chimneys with corbeled caps projecting from the roof on each elevation. Attached to the main block are a series of rear ells covered by low-hipped roofs.  The front facade features an original colossal two-story portico consisting of four unfluted Ionic order columns.

It was listed on the National Register of Historic Places in 1982.

References

Houses on the National Register of Historic Places in Virginia
Colonial Revival architecture in Virginia
Houses completed in 1905
Houses in Albemarle County, Virginia
National Register of Historic Places in Albemarle County, Virginia
1905 establishments in Virginia